Sándor Popovics (22 October 1862 – 15 April 1935) was a Hungarian politician, who served as Minister of Finance in 1918. He was the governor of the Austro-Hungarian Bank between 1909 and 1918. During the peace negotiations in 1920, he attended as a financial expert. From 1924 until his death he served as chairman of the National Bank of Hungary. Popovics was full member of the Hungarian Academy of Sciences.

Works
 A pénz sorsa a háborúban (The fate of the currency in the war), Budapest, 1926.
 A pénz értékállandósága (The constant of the currency's value), Budapest, 1929.
 A társadalmi szervezkedések gazdasági hatásai (The economic effects of the social organisations), Budapest, 1931.

References

 Magyar Életrajzi Lexikon

1862 births
1935 deaths
Burials at Kerepesi Cemetery
People from Pest, Hungary
Finance ministers of Hungary
Governors of the Hungarian National Bank
National Constitution Party politicians